The Siege of Kulaca Hisar or Raid of Kulaca Hisar was a battle fought between the Byzantines and the Turks under the command of Osman Gazi in 1285.

Siege 
As a result of a night raid with a force of 300 people, the castle was captured by the Turks. This is the first castle conquest in the history of the Ottoman Empire. Since the captured Christian people of Kulaca Hisar accepted the rule of Osman Bey, the people there were not harmed.

See also
 Siege of Bursa
 Karacahisar Castle

References 

Emirdağ District
Ancient Byzantium
13th century in the Ottoman Empire
History of Bursa Province